Pierre-Clément de Laussat (23 November 1756 – 10 April 1835) was a French politician, and the 24th Colonial Governor of Louisiana, the last under French rule. He later served as colonial official in Martinique and French Guiana, as well as an administrator in France and Antwerp.

Biography 
Laussat was born in the town of Pau. After serving as receveur général des finances in Pau and Bayonne from 1784 to 1789, he was imprisoned during the Terror, but was released and recruited in the armée des Pyrénées. On April 17, 1797, he was elected to the Council of Ancients. After the coup of 18 Brumaire, he entered the Tribunat on December 25, 1798.

He was appointed by Napoleon Bonaparte to be colonial prefect (governor) of Louisiana in 1802 and arrived in the colony on March 26, 1803, just two weeks before Bonaparte made his decision to sell Louisiana to the United States.  Laussat was initially only to be the interim head of Louisiana until arrival of the Governor General Jean-Baptiste Bernadotte appointed by Bonaparte. However, when Bonaparte rejected Bernadotte's request for additional settlers and support for the posting, Bernadotte declined the governorship. This left Laussat ruling as governor for several months, during which time he abolished the local cabildo and then published the Napoleonic Code in the colony.

Laussat envisioned bringing forth a rebirth of a prosperous French ; however, not all Louisianans were eager to see Republican France in control of the city. Three-fifths of the Ursaline sisters in New Orleans, along with their mother-superior, decided to abandon the city and head to Havana when the Spanish handed over the city. Lassat and other French officials were contemptuous towards the Spanish officials in charge of the territory; he contrasted the "Spanish spirit" as senile, corrupt, racially weak and effeminately degenerate with the "austerity, efficiency, and virility" of Bonapartist republicanism.

Within several months, Laussat heard that Louisiana had been sold to the U.S. but he did not believe it. On July 28, 1803, he wrote to the French government to inquire whether the rumor was true. On August 18, 1803, he received word from Bonaparte that France had declared war on Great Britain and that he was to transfer Louisiana to the United States.

On November 30, 1803, Laussat served as commissioner of the French government in the retrocession of Louisiana from Spain to France. A few weeks later, on December 20, 1803, Laussat transferred the colony to the U.S. representatives, William C.C. Claiborne and James Wilkinson.

On April 21, 1804, Laussat left Louisiana to become colonial prefect of Martinique, serving until 1809 when he was captured and imprisoned by the British.

In 1810, Laussat returned to France and sought a new governmental posting. He was sent to the French Netherlands to oversee the port of occupied Antwerp (1810–1812) and then to serve as prefect of Jemmape (1812–1814). During the Hundred Days, he served as prefect of Pas-de-Calais until the defeat of Napoleon at Waterloo.

During the Bourbon Restoration, he served as commandant of French Guiana from 1819 to 1823, after which he retired to his ancestral château in France where he died in 1835.

Bibliography

References

1756 births
1835 deaths
Governors of Louisiana (New France)
People of the French Revolution
Governors of French Guiana
French Governors of Martinique
Knights of the Order of Saint Louis